The 2020–21 season was Hatayspor's 54th season in existence and the club's first ever season in the top flight of Turkish football. In addition to the domestic league, Hatayspor participated in this season's edition of the Turkish Cup. The season covered the period from July 2020 to 30 June 2021.

Players

Out on loan

Transfers

In

Out

Pre-season and friendlies

Competitions

Overview

Süper Lig

League table

Results summary

Results by round

Matches

Turkish Cup

Statistics

Goalscorers

Last updated: 7 March 2021

References

External links

Hatayspor seasons
Hatayspor